Homa Nategh (May 26, 1934 – January 1, 2016) was an Iranian historian, Professor of History at  University of Tehran. A specialist in the  contemporary history of Iran, she resided in Paris, France, until her death. She was active during Iran's 1979 revolution. After the revolution she was purged from the University of Tehran and moved to Paris, where she was appointed as professor of the Iranian Studies at the Sorbonne. In Sorbonne she published several articles on Iranian history in Qajar period.

Political activities 
Nategh began her political activities when she was a student in Paris, having been described as "sympathetic to feminist causes and to the Ieft wing of the National Front". Ironically enough, however, during the 1979 revolution in Iran she joined voices with fundamentalist Islamists and called for all women to wear Islamic hijab. She was a member of the Confederation of Iranian Students, and one of the first females join it. After the Iranian Revolution, she was associated with the Organization of Iranian People's Fedai Guerrillas and after the split, she sided with the minority faction.

References

External links

1934 births
2016 deaths
People from Urmia
20th-century Iranian historians
Academic staff of the University of Tehran
Academic staff of the University of Paris
Iranian expatriate academics
Iranian expatriates in France
French people of Azerbaijani descent
National Front (Iran) student activists
Iranian Writers Association members
Organization of Iranian People's Fedai Guerrillas members